Sehested Fjord) is a fjord of the King Frederick VI Coast in the Sermersooq municipality, southeastern Greenland.

This fjord was named in 1829 by Lieutenant W. A. Graah after Danish Admiral Christen Thomesen Sehested.

Geography
Sehested Fjord is located north of Timmiarmiut Fjord. To the east it opens into the North Atlantic Ocean with Uiivaq and the entrance of Kattertooq Fjord on the northern side of its mouth and Griffenfeld Island on the southern side. Annat Fjord, with Tasiusaq Bay on its western side, is an inlet on the northern shore of the fjord located 17 km from its mouth. Sikuijuitsoq is another small tributary fjord branching from the Sehested Fjord on the southern shore opposite Annat Fjord. 

This fjord has large, active glaciers at its head. The Rimfaxe, Guldfaxe and Ygdrasil glaciers have their confluence shortly before their terminus at the northwestern end of the fjord.
Flowing from the west, the Garm glacier has two branches near its terminus, one flowing southwards into the Ernineq Fjord of the Timmiarmiut fjord system and the other eastwards into the Sikuijuitsoq, the southern branch of the Sehested Fjord.

Mountains
There are high mountains on both sides of the fjord.  high Peberbøssen, a prominent peak, rises on the King Dan Peninsula (Kong Dan Halvø) on the northern side near the entrance.

See also
List of fjords of Greenland

References

External links
Images - Sehested Fjord (Greenland)
Climate-related glacier fluctuations in southeast Greenland, Geological Survey of Denmark and Greenland, Department of Marine Geology and Glaciology, Copenhagen, Denmark
Fjords of Greenland
Sermersooq